Luxair, legally Luxair S.A., Société Luxembourgeoise de Navigation Aérienne, is the flag carrier airline of Luxembourg with its headquarters and hub at Luxembourg Airport. It operates scheduled services to destinations in Europe, North Africa, the Mediterranean and Middle East with additional charter and seasonal services. It is Luxembourg's only passenger-carrying airline offering regular, non-charter service.

History

Early years
Descended from Luxembourg Airlines, founded in 1948, Luxair was starting to be set up in 1961 to meet the growing demand for air links between Luxembourg and other European cities. In 1962, Luxembourg Airlines became Luxair and began flights by launching a Luxembourg–Paris route with a Fokker F27 Friendship.

From 1964 to 1969, Luxair operated three Lockheed L-1649A Starliner aircraft in a co-operative agreement with Trek Airways, from Luxembourg to Johannesburg. The Starliners were painted in Luxair livery and were registered in Luxembourg. By 1967, Luxair's fleet consisted of three Fokker F27 Friendships and one Vickers Viscount. The latter was written off in a non-fatal accident in 1969 and replaced the following year by the airline's first jet airliner, a Sud Aviation Caravelle. By 1976, Luxair was operating a Boeing 707 with a Boeing 737-200 then joining the fleet in 1977.

Over the years, Luxair gradually introduced further jet aircraft: Boeing 737-400s and Boeing 737-500s; as well as Fokker 50 turboprops and Embraer ERJ-135 and ERJ-145 regional jets. In the 1980s, Boeing 747SPs owned by South African Trek Airways and operated by LUXAVIA were painted in Luxair colours, flying routes between South Africa and Europe, as well as holiday charters from Luxembourg. 
LUXAVIA was a joint venture between Trek Airways and Luxair, enabling Trek Airways to avoid the repercussions of widespread anti-Apartheid boycotts.

Development since the 2000s
In March 2003, Luxair ordered two new Boeing 737-700s to replace its older Boeing aircraft. The first of the new aircraft was delivered on 18 February 2004. A third aircraft was ordered in August 2003 and delivered in January 2005.
Luxair launched a new logo on 21 December 2003 - a flying boomerang to symbolize a new visual identity, which confined the previous logo of 42 years to history.

In an effort to move to an all-jet fleet, the last Fokker 50 aircraft was withdrawn from service in April 2005. The rising cost of oil made operating regional jets increasingly difficult. To lessen its exposure, Luxair decided to reintroduce turboprop aircraft, and in June 2006 it signed a firm order with Bombardier Aerospace for three Dash 8-Q400s, plus three options. The last of the three aircraft was delivered in September 2007. Two additional Q400s were ordered later.

In October 2008, Luxair decided to place an order for its first Boeing 737-800. This aircraft replaced the last Boeing 737-500 in Luxair's fleet and facilitated Luxair's offer on its holiday destinations. In 2009, the airline was awarded as the most punctual scheduled operator at London City Airport during 2008 by Flight on Time, based on CAA statistics. In 2011 Luxair carried 1,302,771 passengers.

In 2013 and 2014, two new Boeing 737-800s fitted with the brand new Boeing Sky Interior became part of the fleet, which enabled Luxair to retire the last Boeing 737-500 from service.

In July 2015, Luxair's minority shareholder Lufthansa announced it would sell its 13 percent stake in the airline that it had held since 1993. The government of Luxembourg was named as the preferred buyer. In November 2015, the sale was finalized when Lufthansa sold its entire stake to the state of Luxembourg. Luxair also announced it would stop flying its route to Frankfurt Airport previously operated on a codeshare with Lufthansa as the latter started the same route itself. Luxair is still part of the Lufthansa frequent flyer program Miles & More.

After the bankruptcy of Air Berlin, Luxair announced they would begin flying from Saarbrücken Airport to Berlin Tegel Airport utilising a Bombardier CRJ700 which Luxair leased from Adria Airways based in Saarbrücken.

Corporate affairs

Ownership
As of November 2015, after Lufthansa sold its shares, the airline is owned by the State of Luxembourg (52.04%), Banque et Caisse d'Épargne de l'État (21.81%), Banque Internationale à Luxembourg (13.14%), the Luxair Group and others (13.11%). In total, the State of Luxembourg owns 74.98% of the company through various state-owned corporations and through its holding of 10% of Banque Internationale à Luxembourg.

Business trends
The key trends for the Luxair Group over recent years are shown below (as at year ending 31 December):

Destinations

Codeshare agreements
Luxair has codeshare agreements with the following airlines:

 Air France
 Air Serbia
 Austrian Airlines
 Hahn Air
 ITA Airways
 LOT Polish Airlines
 Lufthansa
 Scandinavian Airlines
 TAP Air Portugal
 Turkish Airlines

Fleet

Current fleet
, the Luxair fleet consists of the following aircraft:

Special liveries
Starting from 2020 Luxair released some special liveries for some of its aircraft. On July 25, 2021, the company introduced the SUMO Artwork Luxair's Boeing 737/800. The livery was realised by the popular local street artist Christian "SUMO" Pearson. The special livery was meant to spread a positive message at the moment of the restart of operations after the first CoVid 19 Lockdown and was the main action of the company's broader "FlyingIsAnArt" project:

On the 25th of November 2020, the company released a de Havilland Q400 with an orange logo to raise awareness for violence against women.

In July 2022, Luxair was the world first airline to paint a livery of one of its aircraft in rainbow, to support the Luxembourg Pride Month. This project inspired the German carrier Lufthansa, which one year later decided to do the same on one of its aircraft.
In October 2022, Luxair painted one of its aircraft with a pink artwork by the local artist Lisa Junius and in partnership with Think Pink Lux, with the goal to contribute to the Pink October worldwide campaign.

Historical fleet

 Airbus A300B4-203
 Boeing 707
 Boeing 737-200
 Boeing 737-400
 Boeing 737-500
 Boeing 747SP
 Boeing 767-300ER
 Bombardier CRJ700
 Sud Aviation Caravelle 6R 
 Embraer EMB 120 Brasilia
 Embraer ERJ-135
 Embraer ERJ-145
 Fokker F27 Friendship
 Fokker 50
 Vickers Viscount

Accidents and incidents
On 22 December 1969, a Vickers Viscount (registration LX-LGC) arriving from Frankfurt Airport, Germany, landed 60% on the right hand side of R24, hit a snowbank piled up by snowplows at the intersection with runway 20 during landing and rollout at Luxembourg Findel Airport in freezing fog weather. No passengers were killed, but the aircraft was damaged beyond repair. It was scrapped in May 1970.
On 6 November 2002, Luxair Flight 9642, a Fokker 50 (registration LX-LGB) incoming from Berlin, Germany, crashed in a field near the village of Niederanven during its final approach to Luxembourg Findel Airport. Twenty passengers and two crew-members died, including artist Michel Majerus. Only the pilot in command and one passenger survived. This is the only fatal accident in Luxair's history.
On 30 September 2015, Luxair Flight 9562, operated by a Bombardier Q400, was taking off from Saarbrücken Airport when the first officer retracted the landing gear prior to the aircraft lifting off. The aircraft collapsed onto its belly and came to a stop on the runway. The aircraft was damaged beyond repair and Luxair ordered a replacement Q400 to be delivered in August 2016.

References

External links

Airlines of Luxembourg
Airlines established in 1962
Association of European Airlines members
European Regions Airline Association
1962 establishments in Luxembourg
Brands of Luxembourg